Claudia Hengst (born 3 September 1969, in Gräfelfing) is a former German paralympic athlete, who won 25 medals (13 gold) at the Summer Paralympics.

In 2008 were inducted into Paralympic Hall of Fame.

Biography
Her category was L6 and then S10.

See also
List of multiple Paralympic gold medalists
List of multiple Paralympic gold medalists at a single Games

References

External links
 Athlete profile at IPC web site
 Athlete profile at Paralympic Hall of Fame home page
  Claudia Hengst - Munzinger Biographie

Living people
1969 births
Paralympic swimmers of Germany
Swimmers at the 1988 Summer Paralympics
Swimmers at the 1992 Summer Paralympics
Swimmers at the 1996 Summer Paralympics
Swimmers at the 2000 Summer Paralympics
Swimmers at the 2004 Summer Paralympics
Paralympic gold medalists for Germany
Paralympic silver medalists for Germany
Paralympic bronze medalists for Germany
People from Munich (district)
Sportspeople from Upper Bavaria
Medalists at the 1988 Summer Paralympics
Medalists at the 1992 Summer Paralympics
Medalists at the 1996 Summer Paralympics
Medalists at the 2000 Summer Paralympics
Medalists at the 2004 Summer Paralympics
Paralympic medalists in swimming
German female freestyle swimmers
German female backstroke swimmers
German female breaststroke swimmers
German female butterfly swimmers
German female medley swimmers
S10-classified Paralympic swimmers